Saint Vincent and the Grenadines, a former British colony in the Windward Islands, has produced stamps since 8 May 1861. The stamps featured either the British monarch’s head on them or the ER monogram and crown until around 1970. The stamps were printed with just "St. Vincent" until 1992 when the stamps began to print the full country name, "St. Vincent and the Grenadines".

Since around 1988, the country has been a client of the Inter-Governmental Philatelic Corporation.

Early Issues (1861-1912)
The islands first began to issue stamps in 1861 and featured Queen Victoria. They were followed by the stamps of King Edward VII by 1902, which featured his portrait, then those of King George V in 1912.

King George V, King George VI and early Elizabethan issues (1912-1970)

The King George V of 1912 had just only featured his portrait, later ones featured his portrait with island scenes.

They were followed by stamps of his silver jubilee in 1935.

Coronation issues of King George VI followed in 1937, along with the new King George VI stamps, the following year (pictured above).

This was followed by the Victory Stamps of 1946, featuring the king's portrait, along with the Tower of Westminster; as well as the Royal Silver Wedding of 1948.

By 1953 stamps of the coronation of Queen Elizabeth II were introduced, along with stamps showing her portrait and island scenes.

1970-1988
By around 1970 the portraits and the royal ciphers of the Queen were removed. The number of issues had increased since the 1960s and 1970s, showing both local (such as Carnival events) and international events (such as the American Independence Bicentennial of 1976).

Stamps featuring the American Independence Bicentennial in 1976 and the Silver Jubilee of Queen Elizabeth II in 1977 featured portraits of the past monarchs of the United Kingdom and past presidents of the United States of America.

By 1983 the stamps began to show a series of automobile and locomotive stamps, which continued until 1986. As well as showing footballers on the 1986 stamps honouring the 1986 World Cup, as well as cricketers on the 1988 stamps.

IGPC years (1988-present)
Around 1988 the country became a client of the Inter-Governmental Philatelic Corporation, after which the island began to issue stamps of baseball players from 1988 until the mid-1990s, such as Babe Ruth on the 1988 issue. This was followed by Disney themed Christmas stamps of 1988, featuring Mickey Mouse and his friends.

A 1992 issue featuring Elvis Presley proved even more popular. Scott Tilson was able to sell 8,000 sets (out of a run of 20,000) before starting an advertising campaign. The general manager of the Philatelic Service, Alphonso Dennie, ranked the Elvis issue as the best selling since its Michael Jackson issue, which sold well in Asia.

By the early-1990s an excessive number of issues arose. In 1994 it began issuing stamps showing Japanese football players and teams (such as JEF United) as well as the 1994 World Cup in the USA.

In 1996 it became one of the first countries to issue stamps featuring Star Wars. The following year it began to issue stamps on Star Trek: Voyager.

By 2001-02 it issued stamps featuring Pokémon. As well it was also the first country to issue stamps showing Elvis Presley since 1987. Other stamps showed Popeye and Betty Boop.

References

Further reading
 Brown, S.A. The Postage Stamps of St. Vincent. London: Office of "Stamp Collecting", 1917 24p.
 Ishihara, Minoru. The Stamps of St. Vincent 1861-81. Osaka: Foreign Stamp Study Club of Japan, 1975 48p.
 Louka, Michael N. Cancellations on St. Vincent Stamps 1861-97: Obliterators, St. Vincent and Kingstown Datestamps. Alicante: British West Indies Study Circle, 2009  44p.
 Napier, Francis H. and E.D. Bacon. Saint Vincent: with notes and publishers' prices. London: Stanley Gibbons, 1895 107p. Reprinted in 1998.
 Pierce, Arthur D., J.L. Messenger & Robson Lowe. St Vincent: The Postal History 1762-1965: The Postage Stamps 1861-1897: The Cancellations and Handstamps 1861-1915: The Revenue Stamps 1882-1897. London: Robson Lowe, 1971 184p.
 Proud, Edward B. and J. Chin Aleong. The Postal History of St Lucia and St Vincent. Heathfield: Proud Publications Ltd., 2006  472p.
 Zirinsky, Steven. St. Vincent & the Grenadines, Overprints 1999-2004. New York: The Author, 2007 44p.

Communications in Saint Vincent and the Grenadines
St. Vincent and the Grenadines